The crescent-faced antpitta (Grallaricula lineifrons) is a species of bird in the family Grallariidae. It is found in Colombia and Ecuador. Its natural habitat is subtropical or tropical moist montane forest. It is becoming rare due to habitat loss.

References

External links

crescent-faced antpitta
Birds of the Colombian Andes
Birds of the Ecuadorian Andes
crescent-faced antpitta
Taxonomy articles created by Polbot